Helen Margaret Ranney (April 12, 1920 – April 5, 2010) was an American doctor and hematologist who made significant contributions to research on sickle-cell anemia.

Early life
Ranney was born in Summer Hill, Cayuga County, New York, where her parents ran a dairy farm. Her mother was a teacher and both her parents encouraged her in her studies and pursuing a professional career.  She attended a one-room school as a child, and later attended Barnard College (graduating cum laude in 1941) with initial plans to study law; however, it was here that she decided to study medicine, saying "Medicine attempts to fix what it studies."  She initially faced barriers to her continuing a medical education at Columbia, based on her gender, but policy changes during World War II allowed for her admission to the College of Physicians and Surgeons at Columbia University.

Career
Ranney was a professor at Harvard Medical School. She was also a staff physician at Brigham and Women's Hospital.
She was the first woman to serve as president of the Association of American Physicians, and of the American Society of Hematology. She was also one of the first women to be admitted to the American Society for Clinical Investigation and was the first woman honored as a Distinguished Physician of the Veterans Administration. Her research on hemoglobin started in 1953. She was the first to use paper electropheresis for separating human hemoglobin, work which helped in understanding the inheritance of sickle-cell disease. In 1960 she co-founded the heredity clinic at Albert Einstein College of Medicine.

Ranney was a faculty member and the first female head of the department of medicine at the University of California, San Diego School of Medicine. In 1973, she was elected a member of the National Academy of Sciences and the Institute of Medicine. She was elected a Fellow of the American Academy of Arts and Sciences in 1975.

Awards, honors, and memberships 

 Dr. Ranney was awarded the Dr. Martin Luther King, Jr., Medical Achievement Award in 1972 for her work with blood disorders, which included the first description of the abnormal blood cell structure and genetic factors linked to sickle cell anemia.
 President of Association of American Physicians (the first woman to hold this office).
 Distinguished Physician of the Veterans Administration (the first woman so honored).
 President of the American Society of Hematology.
 Master of the American College of Physicians.
 Elected in 1973 to the Institute of Medicine (now called the National Academies of Sciences, Engineering, & Medicine)

References

External links

 H. Franklin Bunn, "Helen M. Ranney", Biographical Memoirs of the National Academy of Sciences (2014)

1920 births
2010 deaths
American hematologists
University of California, San Diego faculty
Fellows of the American Academy of Arts and Sciences
Members of the United States National Academy of Sciences
Members of the National Academy of Medicine
Women hematologists
Columbia University alumni
Barnard College alumni
20th-century American women physicians
20th-century American physicians
20th-century American women scientists
21st-century American women
Presidents of the American Society of Hematology